Cha-Cha, Cha Cha, ChaCha or Chacha may refer to:

Music
Cha-cha-cha (dance), a dance of Cuban origin
Cha-cha-cha (music), a genre of Cuban music
Cha Cha (album), a 1978 album by Herman Brood & His Wild Romance
Cha Cha (soundtrack), the soundtrack for the 1979 film
"Cha Cha" (song), a 2006 song by Latin artist, Chelo
"Cha Cha Slide", a 2000 dance song by DJ Casper
Cha Cha Cohen, 1990s band name

People
Jawaharlal Nehru (1889–1964), or Chacha Nehru, as he was known among the children.
Yodo-dono (1569–1615), also known as Lady Chacha, a concubine of Hideyoshi Toyotomi
Czarina Marie Balba-Guevarra (born 1987), also known as DJ Chacha, Filipino actress and Radio DJ
Shirley Muldowney (born June 19, 1940), former top fuel drag racer often referred to by the nickname "Cha Cha"
Chacha Cricket (born 1949), famous Pakistani cricket fan, literally "Uncle Cricket"
Cha Cha (rapper), American rapper
Chacha Cañete (born 2004), Filipino actress
Cha Cha Namdar (born 1956), nickname of Asghar Shadin Namdar, Iranian-American soccer player
Cha Cha Malone (born 1987), nickname of Chase Vincent Malone, American entertainer
Jose Cha Cha Jimenez (born 1948), American political activist
Cha Cha, stage name of Cha Seung-woo (born 1978), South Korean singer and actor
Serena ChaCha (born 1990), stagename of Myron Morgan, Panamanian-American drag performer and wig maker

History 
Chacha Empire, Hindu empire which ruled over Sindh
Chacha dynasty, Hindu Brahmin dynasty

Books and films
Cha Cha (film), a 1979 Dutch film
Chacha Chaudhary, an Indian comic book hero
Chacha, a cartoon Chinese Internet police officer from Jingjing and Chacha
Bubu Chacha, a Japanese anime series
Akazukin Chacha or Red Riding Hood Chacha, a Japanese manga series created by Min Ayahana

Technology
ChaCha (search engine), a search engine with a guided search function
ChaCha (cipher), a stream cipher
HTC ChaCha, a smartphone by HTC
Cha-Cha, a method of creating stereo images by moving one camera along a sliding baseline; see Stereoscopy

Other uses 
 Chacha language, the name sometimes given to the language of the Chachapoya people
 Chacha (brandy), a Georgian grape vodka
 Charter Change, a popular nickname for proposed amendments to the Constitution of the Philippines
 Mount Chacha, a mountain in Kunashiri, Japan

See also
Cha-cha-cha (disambiguation)
Chachas District